Alexander Gurevich (born February 7, 1944) is an Israeli painter and graphic artist. He was born in Alapaevsk, Ural (former Soviet Union) where his family stayed during World War II. Gurevich's parents divorced when he was young; he and his mother returned to her hometown Leningrad when he was 18 months old. He was raised by his grandparents from mother's side. After finishing high school, he attended the then Leningrad Electrotechnical Institute (LETI) (now Saint Petersburg State Electrotechnical University)  during 1961-1967, majoring in electronic engineering. Upon graduation Gurevich worked as an engineer for 5 years. In 1971 Gurevich enlisted into High Art College, named Muhina (now Saint Petersburg Art and Industry Academy), from which he graduated 3.5 years later; after earning a degree in Industrial Design. He worked as a decorator for 15 following years, at the same time pursuing his unofficial creative career as an artist.

Work in the Soviet Union
In the 70s Gurevich took part in various exhibitions of unofficial art, as a member of so-called Fellowship of Experimental Art. In 1975 he became a member of Alef group (a group of Jewish artists, founded by Eugene Abeshaus in Leningrad.)  Their landmark exhibition, which included the artists Alexander Manusov, Anatoli Basin and Alexander Okun, was viewed by four thousand people in its first week alone. Membership to the Aleph group was dangerous politically, and by 1977 the group disbanded. In 1989 he participated in the Art Festival "Creativity under Duress" in Louisville, Kentucky, USA.

Work in Israel
In 1993 Gurevich together with his family emigrated to Israel. He has been living and working in Jerusalem since then. In 1994 he became a member of the Artists House (Beit Amanim) in Jerusalem. In 2008 an album about his life and art was published by Ruvim Braude  in San Francisco, California, USA ("Alexander Gurevich"); with articles by B. Bernstein and N. Blagodatov.

Gurevich has had one-man exhibitions in galleries in the United States, Russia, Germany and Israel.

Works in museums 
The Russian Museum
Magnes Collection of Jewish Art and Life
 Oberhessisches_Museum, Gissen, Germany  
Osaka Contemporary Art Center 
Museum-non-conformist-art, St.Petersburg
Museum of Art Saint Petersburg XX-XXI c.(МИСП), Russia

Exhibitions 
 1995, Jerusalem-Artists House
 1995, Gallery Kunstzaum Am Hallhof, Memingen, Germany
 1996, Gallery “Serebryany vek”, S. Petersburg, Russia
 1998, Gallery “Anna”, S. Petersburg
 1999, Gallery “Sara Kishon”, Tel Aviv
 1999, Oberhessisches Museum, Gissen, Germany
 2000, Gallery “Art Dome”, San Francisco, USA
 2002, Gallery “Kunst +” Wetzlar, Germany
 2008, Teatron Ierushalaim, Jerusalem 
 2009, Gallery Karandagi, Tel Aviv 
 2011, Gallery “Art Dome”, San Francisco, USA
 2012, Gallery "Beit Naima", Jerusalem 
 2015, Gallery “Colorida”, Lisbon, Portugal.
 2019, Gallery "Art Dome", San Francisco, USA
 2019, London Art Biennale, UK,

References

Further reading 

From Gulag to Glasnost: Nonconformist Art from the Soviet Union. The N&N Dodge Collection. Thames and Hudson, New York, 1995
12 from the Soviet Underground. Catalogue, Berkeley, CA, 1976
21 Artists from The Fellowship for Experimental Art, gallery Route One, USA, 1988
Creativity Under Duress: From Gulag To Glasnost. Catalogue, Louisville, KY, 1989
Soltes, Ori Z. III. Art, Politics, Literature and Religion, Art and the Holocaust. B'nai B'rith Klutznick National Museum, Washington DC. P. 6-8
Modern Art Gallery "Anna", catalogue, Leningrad,1990
Alexandr Gurevich - biblical series-painting, catalogue, St. Petersburg, 1993
Alexander Gurevich - Painting, David Gallery, catalogue, Jerusalem,2000
Boris Bernstein, Nikolai Blagodatov, "Alexander Gurevich", San Francisco 2008 (album)
Newspaper "Vesti", application "Okna", 18 December 2008
"Sea Level", catalogue II international Art Festival, "Pushkinskaya-10" art center, 2009
 7th international triennial of graphic art, 2012 - 348 p.: ill.
 International Contemporary Artists, volume 8, ICA Publishing. 2014
 Colorida gallery, Lisbon, catalog 2015, http://www.colorida.biz/gurevich.jpg
 Leningrad Underground, New Museum,2015, Sn. Petersburg,Russia
 The Art Encyclopedia, Jerusalem, Israel, 2016

1944 births
Living people
Israeli painters